Robertus Henricus "Robbert" Dijkgraaf FRSE (Dutch: [ ]; born 24 January 1960) is a Dutch theoretical physicist, mathematician and string theorist, and the current Minister of Education, Culture and Science in the Netherlands. From July 2012 until his inauguration as minister in January 2022, he had been the director and Leon Levy professor at the Institute for Advanced Study in Princeton, New Jersey, and a tenured professor at the University of Amsterdam.

Early life and education
Robertus Henricus Dijkgraaf was born on 24 January 1960 in Ridderkerk, Netherlands. Dijkgraaf attended the Erasmiaans Gymnasium in Rotterdam, Netherlands.

He started his education in physics at Utrecht University in 1978. After completing his candidate's degree (equivalent to BSc degree) in 1982, he briefly turned away from physics to pursue a painting education at the Gerrit Rietveld Academie. In 1984, he returned to Utrecht University and obtained an MSc degree in theoretical physics in 1986. He then went on to performing doctoral research under supervision of future Nobel laureate Gerard 't Hooft. He studied together with the twins Erik and Herman Verlinde. The original arrangement was that only one of the trio would work on string theory, but all three ended up writing their thesis on this subject. Dijkgraaf obtained his PhD degree cum laude in 1989. His thesis was titled A Geometrical Approach to Two Dimensional Conformal Field Theory.

For a few years he worked as a postdoctoral researcher at the Institute for Advanced Study, working alongside Edward Witten.

Work 
In 1992, he was appointed professor of mathematical physics at the University of Amsterdam, a chair he held until 2004, when he was appointed distinguished professor at the same university.

From 2008 to 2012 he was president of the Royal Netherlands Academy of Arts and Sciences. He was elected as one of the two co-chairs of the InterAcademy Council for the period 2009 to 2013.

Starting 2012, Dijkgraaf became the director of the Institute for Advanced Study, an independent academic institution located in the town of Princeton, New Jersey. On that date, he stepped down from his position as president of the Royal Netherlands Academy of Arts and Sciences.

He has served on numerous boards including at the Teylers Museum and the NEMO Science Museum.

He regularly appears on Dutch television and has a monthly column in the Dutch newspaper NRC Handelsblad.

Political career
Since 10 January 2022, Dijkgraaf has been serving as the Education Secretary in the Dutch government.

Other activities
 Simons Foundation, Member of the Board of Directors (since 2021)
 Scholars at Risk (SAR), Member of the Ambassadors Council

Awards and honors
In 1998 Dijkgraaf was an Invited Speaker at the International Congress of Mathematicians in Berlin.

In 2003, Dijkgraaf was awarded the Spinoza Prize. In doing so he became the first recipient of the award whose advisor also was a recipient (Gerard 't Hooft received the first Spinoza Prize in 1995). He used part of his Spinoza Prize grant to set up a website targeted at children and promoting science: Proefjes.nl.

Dijkgraaf is an elected Member of the Royal Netherlands Academy of Arts and Sciences since 2003 and of the Royal Holland Society of Sciences and Humanities.

On 30 May 2012, he was elected an Honorary Member of both the Royal Netherlands Chemical Society and the Netherlands' Physical Society. On 5 June 2012, Dijkgraaf was appointed a Knight of the Order of the Netherlands Lion. In 2012, he became a Fellow of the American Mathematical Society.

He was elected an Honorary Fellow of the Royal Society of Edinburgh in 2013. That same year, he was elected to the American Philosophical Society.

He received honorary doctorates from the Vrije Universiteit Brussel and Leiden University in 2019. In 2019,  Dijkgraaf was awarded the inaugural Iris Medal for Excellent Science Communication, presented at the Evening of Science & Society in the Ridderzaal in The Hague, by Ingrid van Engelshoven, Minister of Education, Culture, and Science, in the presence of King Willem-Alexander.

Research
Dijkgraaf's research focuses on string theory and the interface of mathematics and physics in general. He is best known for his work on topological string theory and matrix models, and his name has been given to the Dijkgraaf-Witten invariants and the Witten-Dijkgraaf-Verlinde-Verlinde formula.

Personal life
Dijkgraaf is married to the author  and has three children. Their daughter Charlotte was born with a rare type of Leukemia and was the subject of book written by her mother Pia de Jong, Saving Charlotte: A Mother and the Power of Intuition.

Bibliography

Research articles 
Dijkgraaf has co-authored and published more than 70 research articles in the field of string theory and physics, with many other researchers including: Cumrun Vafa, Lotte Hollands, Erik Verlinde, Herman Verlinde, Hirosi Ooguri, Gregory Moore, Rajesh Gopakumar, Sergei Gukov, Miranda Cheng, and others. This is a select list of these works:

Books

References

External links 

 Robbert Dijkgraaf, official website
 Robbert Dijkgraaf, official profile for IAS
 Official website of Institute for Advanced Study

1960 births
Directors of the Institute for Advanced Study
Donegall Lecturers of Mathematics at Trinity College Dublin
Dutch expatriates in the United States
Fellows of the American Mathematical Society
Gerrit Rietveld Academie alumni
Knights of the Order of the Netherlands Lion
Living people
Members of the Royal Netherlands Academy of Arts and Sciences
People from Ridderkerk
Spinoza Prize winners
Dutch string theorists
Trustees of the Institute for Advanced Study
Academic staff of the University of Amsterdam
Utrecht University alumni